Mangalam is an Indian Malayalam-language weekly magazine based in Kottayam, Kerala, India. Sajil Sreedhar is the current editor of Mangalam Weekly.

History and profile
Mangalam was started by M. C. Varghese in 1969 as a monthly magazine. He also edited the magazine, which was later published on a weekly basis. The magazine is published by Mangalam Publications. It had a circulation of 1.7 million copies in 1984, and publishes a special international edition for non-residents.

It is known for the regular column "Victims of cruel fate", which brings attention to, and raises funds for people who have suffered. It has also weekly reading material relating to dowry victims.

The magazine is also published in Kannada. Mangalam finished the print edition in April 2022 and converted to Digital Platform. Renowned Author Sajil Sreedhar headed the editorial team.

Editors
 Devasya Manimla (1969 – 1973)
 Issac Pilathara (1973 – 1974)
 Dr. George Thayyil (1975 – 1976)
 Ambattu Sukumaran Nair (1977 – 1982)
 Dr. Naduvattom Sathyaseelan (1983 – 1986) (1988 – 1995) (2007 – 2008)
 M. J. Darris (1986 – 1988)
 Hakim Nattasery (1995–  2002) (2009 – 2012)
 P.O.Mohan (2003- 2006) (2018- 2020)
 Sajil Sreedhar (2012 – 2018) (2020-2023)

References 

1969 establishments in Kerala
Monthly magazines published in India
Weekly magazines published in India
Local interest magazines
Magazines established in 1969
Malayalam-language magazines